Jeffrey Paul "Jeph" Jacques (born June 17, 1980) is an American cartoonist who writes and draws the webcomics Questionable Content, Alice Grove, and DORD (and formerly "Indietits").

Personal life 
Jacques was born in Rockville, Maryland, and was later adopted. He has a younger brother named Justin.

Jacques lived near Northampton, Massachusetts, where Questionable Content is set; in 2015, he moved to Halifax, Nova Scotia.

Jacques graduated from Hampshire College with a degree in music. He was married to his business manager Cristi until their amicable separation in 2014.  In 2017, Jacques travelled to France and got married.

Questionable Content

Questionable Content (QC) is a comedic slice-of-life webcomic that Jacques started on August 1, 2003. It was initially published two days a week, and then moved up to three updates a week when Jacques published strip #16. On September 4, 2004, Jacques lost his day job, and decided to try publishing QC every weekday and make a living selling QC-related T-shirts.

Other artistic endeavors
Jacques was a member of Dayfree Press, an online webcomic syndicate which included other artists such as Christian Fundin and Pontus Madsen of Little Gamers, Sam Logan of Sam and Fuzzy, and Ryan North of Dinosaur Comics.

Jacques launched indietits as an anonymous side project on April 1, 2005, to use ideas that did not fit into Questionable Content setting. Compared to Questionable Content, it is a simple strip, eschewing detailed art and linear storyline in favour of reusable pre-drawn panels and one-shot jokes. To further broaden his drawing limits, Jacques created Jephdraw to place unnamed drawings of his onto the Internet. He puts anything from favored panels to simple sketches for others to see what he does in his spare time.

In September 2014, Jacques launched a new comic, Alice Grove, which updated once per week until the story finished in July 2017.

Early in 2015 Jacques purchased the domain name walmart.horse (using the more recently available ICANN-era generic top-level domains). The website's sole page is an image of a horse in front of a Walmart store. Jacques created the website as a piece of postmodernist "nonsense-art". In March Jacques posted a cease and desist letter he received from Walmart who claimed the website diluted their intellectual property. Although Jacques said he believes the site to be fair use, he said he would be willing to post a disclaimer on the site indicating that it is parody if Walmart requested it. Jacques gave up the domain after Walmart filed a domain dispute.

In October 2015, Jacques launched a new strip titled Derelict Orbital Reflector Devices at the URL "dord.horse". The strip revolves around a pair of sentient solar collection satellites (known as "DORDs"), part of a network of 2 similar satellites that were placed around the Sun to gather energy for a civilization that has long since departed, leaving the DORDs to contemplate their purpose and while away vast stretches of idle time. Each strip consists of a centrally-placed white sun disk on a black starfield, with the two DORDs (shaped like the letter "H" in a highly bolded font, with two thick side panels connected by a narrow body) assuming various positions in front of the sun, and text balloons for either or both of them in most panels. DORD updated on a daily basis, but no strips have been published since November 19, 2015. The domain registration for "dord.horse" expired.

Deathmøle
In 2005 Jacques launched Deathmøle, a virtual post-metal band whose works are available online. The band is currently composed of three characters from his comic, Questionable Content. The name for the band appears in Strip 554 for the first time. Since its inception, Jacques has periodically released individual Deathmøle songs through his LiveJournal or his Tumblr where they remain available; newer albums have been released on BandCamp.

Jacques states that Deathmøle's style "...started out as a joke- I wanted to write and record a really stupid metal song ... and it turned out to be really fun. So fun, in fact, that I started writing more 'serious' metal tracks, and that’s ... how the music evolved."

In chronological order, the Deathmøle albums are Moletopopolis, Long Songs, ???, Trial Period (EP), Amps, Absent Gods & Creatures Foul, Fear of Black Horses, Meade's Army, Advances, Permanence (ongoing)  and finally Jephmøle (ongoing). Each album typically has seven or eight tracks with Trial Period's three and Moletopopolis' fifteen being the extremes. The music is Jacques' original work, with the exception of a cover of Low's "Two-step" on Long Songs.

On August 11, 2013, Jacques launched a Kickstarter project with a goal of $9,500 to professionally record the Deathmøle album Permanence. On September 10, 2013, the Kickstarter projects funding period ended with a total funding of $141,115 breaking all 10 of his listed stretch goals. Much of the funding came from fans of QC.

Honors

Jacques was the Artist Guest of Honor at the 2006 Albacon.  His webcomic Questionable Content has been honored multiple times in the Web Cartoonists' Choice Awards.

References

External links
 Questionable Content
 Alice Grove
 Jeph Jacques on Bandcamp

Interviews with Jeph Jacques
 "Questionable Creator: George Curtis Interviews Jeph Jacques" (Comixpedia; March 9, 2006)
 "Interview with Jeph Jacques and other webcomic artists" (Talk Radio Meltdown; January 29, 2011)

American comics artists
American comics writers
American webcomic creators
Artists from Maryland
Writers from Maryland
Artists from Massachusetts
Writers from Massachusetts
Hampshire College alumni
People from Rockville, Maryland
People from Northampton, Massachusetts
1980 births
Living people
Patreon creators